Market Street is one of the principal retail streets in Manchester, England. It runs from its junction with Piccadilly and Mosley Street, close to Piccadilly Gardens, in the east to where it meets St. Mary's Gate at the crossroads with Exchange Street and New Cathedral Street in the west. St Mary's Gate then continues to where it meets Deansgate (A56). Other major streets crossed are High Street, Corporation Street (on the north side), Cross Street and Fountain Street (on the south side).

History 

Market Street in Manchester, once known as Market Stead Lane, lies along the former route of the A6 road which goes from Luton, Bedfordshire, to Carlisle, Cumbria. The A6 arrives at Manchester city centre as London Road and formerly went north-west along Piccadilly, Market Street, St. Mary's Gate and Blackfriars Street and then over the River Irwell to Blackfriars Street, Salford. But since the pedestrianisation of Market Street the A6 disappears at the junction of Piccadilly and Oldham Street to reemerge in Salford as Chapel Street.

Some of modern Market Street is a pedestrian zone with motor vehicle access limited to the emergency services, maintenance workers and deliveries to the adjacent shops. The pedestrianisation is broken by High Street, which is open to general traffic, and the south-eastern end of the street is open to trams at the Metrolink tram stop.

Layout and shops

Starting in the east at Piccadilly/Mosley Street, the street shares its space equally between pedestrian walkways and two Metrolink tram lines. Standing on opposite sides of the tram lines loom the imposing edifices of two large department stores belonging to Debenhams (formerly Ryland's and Paulden's) to the north and Primark (formerly Lewis's department store, 1877–2001) to the south. Moving west, the street crosses Fountain Street and High Street where the tram lines turn away towards the north.

With the removal of the tram lines, Market Street becomes an entirely pedestrian zone bustling with shoppers. Dominating the entire north side of this section is the Manchester Arndale Centre, an indoor shopping complex. A large variety of shops of various sizes line the south side of the street.

Throughout the pedestrian zone there can often be found a large number of street traders and entertainers. Such entertainers have in the past included traditional buskers, bagpipes players and even string quartets.

Reaching the end of the Arndale Centre, the street crosses Corporation Street and Cross Street, ceasing to be a pedestrian zone and continues on to end where it meets St. Mary's Gate at the crossroads with Exchange Street and New Cathedral Street. This western section of Market Street is lined with the Marks & Spencer department store on its north side and another series of smaller shops to the south.

At its western end, Market Street meets St Mary's Gate, which then continues on to meet Deansgate (A56) a former Roman road.

George Sampson, the 2008 winner of Britain's Got Talent, honed many of his street dancing skills on Market Street.

List of notable stores:
Aldi
AllSaints
American Apparel
Ann Summers
Boots
British Home Stores
Clarks
Debenhams
Esprit
H&M
HMV
Sports Direct
Primark
Mango
Marks & Spencer
Nike
Tesco Metro
TK Maxx
Urban Outfitters
Zara

References

Streets in Manchester
Shopping streets in Manchester
Tourist attractions in Manchester
Pedestrian streets in the United Kingdom